Heather Watson was the defending champion, but chose not to participate.

Amra Sadiković won the title defeating Gabriela Dabrowski in the final 6–4, 6–2.

Seeds

Main draw

Finals

Top half

Bottom half

References
 Main Draw
 Qualifying Draw

Tevlin Women's Challenger
Tevlin Women's Challenger